Makfi (foaled 4 March 2007) is a British-bred, French-trained Thoroughbred racehorse and sire. In 2010 he won the 2000 Guineas and Prix Jacques Le Marois.

Background
Makfi's sire is Irish 2,000 Guineas and Prix Jacques Le Marois winner Dubawi. Makfi was one of Dubawi's first crop of foals, which also included Poet's Voice and Monterosso. Makfi's dam, Dhelaal, is a daughter of Green Desert and a half-sister of the Cartier Champion Two-year-old Colt Alhaarth. As a granddaughter of the broodmare Green Valley, Dhelaal was also closely related to Green Dancer, Solemia and Authorized. He went into training with Marcus Tregoning in England and was owned by his breeder Hamdan Al Maktoum. He was sold as an unraced two-year-old at the Tattersall's Horses in Training Sale in October 2009 at Newmarket.He was transferred to France and trained by Mikel Delzangles and owned by Mathieu Offenstadt.

Racing career
Makfi made his first start in 2009, winning a five-runner race at Fontainebleau. This was his only start as a two-year-old and was next seen easily winning the Prix Djebel in April 2010. He then started the 2000 Guineas at Newmarket as a 33/1 outsider. In the race jockey Christophe Lemaire held Makfi up towards the rear of the field. He made progress thought the field with two furlongs left to run and overtook leading Dick Turpin inside the final furlong. He went on to with the race by 1¼ lengths from Dick Turpin, with Canford Cliffs a further ½ length back in third place. The pre-race favourite St Nicholas Abbey finished in sixth place.

Makfi followed his 2000 Guineas success with a disappointing run in the St James's Palace Stakes at Royal Ascot, where he finished in seventh behind winner Canford Cliffs. He then faced seven rivals, including Goldikova and Paco Boy, in the Prix Jacques Le Marois. He took the lead with half a furlong to run and ran on to win by 2½ lengths from 4/6 favourite Goldikova, with Paco Boy just behind her in third. Makfi returned to Ascot for his final race, the Queen Elizabeth II Stakes. He started as the even money favourite, but could only finish in fifth place, about three lengths behind winner Poet's Voice.

Assessment
Makfi was officially rated as the joint third best horse in the world in 2010, with a rating of 128. The only horses rated higher were Harbinger and Blame, making Makfi the top miler in the world that year.

Stud career
After being treated for ringworm in October 2010 Makfi was retired to Tweenhills Stud in Gloucestershire.  His 2012 fee was £25,000 and it remained the same for 2013. 

He has also been shuttled to stand in New Zealand during the Southern hemisphere breeding season. Makfi's first crop of foals included the Poule d'Essai des Poulains winner Make Believe. He stood at Westbury Stud from 2011 to 2016.

In late 2014 he transferred to the Haras de Bonneval in France for the 2015 covering season as part of a deal involving the Aga Khan and Qatar Bloodstock.

Notable progeny

c = colt, f = filly, g = gelding, m = mare

Pedigree

References

External links
 Career 1-2-3 Colour Chart – Makfi

2007 racehorse births
Racehorses bred in the United Kingdom
Racehorses trained in France
Thoroughbred family 16-c
2000 Guineas winners